The Saint-Étienne – Gorges de la Loire Nature Reserve is a natural reserve located in Saint-Étienne, France. It was created on  1988 and is made up of 312 hectares of the river Loire.

Nature reserves in France
Geography of Loire (department)
Saint-Étienne
Tourist attractions in Loire (department)